Stuckertiella is a genus of South American flowering plants in the daisy family.

 Species
 Stuckertiella capitata (Wedd.) Beauverd - Peru, Bolivia, Ecuador, northwestern Argentina
 Stuckertiella peregrina Beauverd - Argentina

References

Asteraceae genera
Gnaphalieae
Flora of South America